is a passenger railway station located in the city of Takamatsu, Kagawa, Japan.  It is operated by the private transportation company Takamatsu-Kotohira Electric Railroad (Kotoden) and is designated station "S04".

Lines
Kasugagawa Station is a station of the Kotoden Shido Line and is located 3.0 km from the opposing terminus of the line at Kawaramachi Station].

Layout
Kasugagawa Station has two side platforms serving two tracks, connected by a level crossing. There is no station building. . The station is unmanned.

Platforms

Adjacent stations

History
Kasugagawa Station opened on November 18, 1911 on the Tosan Electric Tramway. On November 1, 1943 it became a station on the Takamatsu-Kotohira Electric Railway.

Surrounding area
Japan National Route 11
Takamatsu Municipal Kitakita Elementary Schoo

See also
 List of railway stations in Japan

References

External links

  

Railway stations in Takamatsu
Railway stations in Japan opened in 1911
Stations of Takamatsu-Kotohira Electric Railroad